Roll Call is the debut and only album recorded by girl group IQ. During its first release, the album came with a DVD of an introduction featuring IQ, performances and IQ with groups such as B5, Jada and Everlife. The album was later sold as an Enhanced CD with the audio and video all on one disc.

Featured appearances
The album features other performers such as AKA Bu3TA, Andrew Valerio, Breje and Travis Hayes, all local rappers from Massachusetts.  Andrew is Gicelle's brother. On the songs, "Is It True", and "It's Like That", vocals by sisters Yolanda and Yalonda Riverra are credited.

Singles
"Big Girls Don't Cry", the first single released from the album, is a remake of Frankie Valli and the Four Seasons' 1960s song. Other singles include "Missing You", "School", and "Crush On U".

Track listing
"Ma'kin Cash, Ma'kin Money"
"Big Girls Don't Cry"
"Crush On U"
"School"
"Harder"
"Get Your Bump On"
"Stay True 2 The Game"
"Talkin Boy"
"It's Like That"
"Missing You"
"Is It True"
"School (Club Mix)"
"Roll Call"

2006 debut albums
IQ (girl group) albums